Krishnapur J N M C High School is a state-run secondary school for boys at Kestopur, Kolkata, West Bengal, India. Classes are taught in Bengali, from years 5 to 10. The school was established in 1939.

See also
Education in India
List of schools in India
Education in West Bengal

References

External links 
 

High schools and secondary schools in Kolkata
Educational institutions established in 1939
1939 establishments in British India